The Soravia Center, also known as World Trade Center Skopje (Macedonian: Соравиа Центар / Светски Трговски Центар)  is a building in Skopje, North Macedonia. Previously twelve floors and thirty meters high, the new building has fifteen floors and a height of thirty-seven meters.

External links
Macedonian Information Agency - Отворен новиот бизнис центар „Соравија центар“ во Скопје

Buildings and structures in Skopje